Katharina Knie is a 1929 German silent drama film directed by Karl Grune and starring Eugen Klöpfer, Carmen Boni and Adele Sandrock. It is based on the 1928 play of the same title by Carl Zuckmayer. It was shot at the Babelsberg Studios in Berlin The film's art direction was by Robert Neppach and Erwin Scharf. It was distributed by the Munich-based Bavaria Film.

Cast
 Eugen Klöpfer as Der alte Knie 
 Carmen Boni as Katherina Knie 
 Adele Sandrock as Bibo 
 Fritz Kampers as Ignaz Scheel, Trapezkünstler 
 Vladimir Sokoloff as Julius, der Clown 
 Viktor de Kowa as Lorenz Knie 
 Peter Voß as Rothhacker, Gutsbesitzer 
 Frida Richard as Rothhackers Mutter 
 Fraenze Roloff as Magd 
 Willi Forst as Dr. Schindler 
 Ilse Bachmann as Seine Freundin 
 Louis Treumann as Variétedirektor 
 Wilhelm Diegelmann as Gerichtsvollzieher 
 Carla Bartheel   
 Ernst Busch   
 Karl Etlinger   
 Ursula Grabley   
 Otto Sauter-Sarto  
 Ludwig Stössel   
 Michael von Newlinsky   
 Aribert Wäscher

References

Bibliography
 Kreimeier, Klaus. The Ufa Story: A History of Germany's Greatest Film Company, 1918-1945. University of California Press, 1999.

External links

1929 films
Films of the Weimar Republic
German silent feature films
German drama films
Films directed by Karl Grune
German films based on plays
Films based on works by Carl Zuckmayer
1929 drama films
Circus films
Bavaria Film films
German black-and-white films
Silent drama films
Films shot at Babelsberg Studios
1920s German films